Nalgonda Lok Sabha constituency is one of the 17 Lok Sabha (Lower House of the Parliament) constituencies in Telangana state in southern India.

Nalamada Uttam Kumar Reddy of INC is the current MP.

Assembly segments
The Nalgonda Lok Sabha constituency presently comprises the following Legislative Assembly segments:

Members of Parliament

Election results

General Election, 2019

General Election, 2014

General Election, 2009

General Election, 2004

General Election, 1999

General Election, 1998

General Election, 1996

General Election, 1991

See also
 Nalgonda district
 List of Constituencies of the Lok Sabha

References

External links
 Nalgonda lok sabha  constituency election 2019 date and schedule

Lok Sabha constituencies in Telangana
Nalgonda district